List of British Jewish scientists is a list that includes scientists from the United Kingdom and its predecessor states who are or were Jewish or of Jewish descent.

Physicists
 Petrus Alphonsi, Spanish (not British) astronomer and doctor
 Edward Neville da Costa Andrade
 Sir Michael Berry, mathematical physicist
 Moses Blackman
 David Bohm, physicist, philosopher
 Sir Hermann Bondi, Austrian-born British cosmologist
 Max Born, physicist, Nobel Prize 1954 (converted to Lutheranism)
 Samuel Devons, physicist
 Cyril Domb, physicist, President of Association of Orthodox Jewish Scientists
 Paul Eisler, inventor of the printed circuit board
 Michael Fisher
 Otto Robert Frisch
 Herbert Frohlich
 Dennis Gabor, Nobel Prize for Physics 1971
 Sir David Lionel Goldsmid-Stern-Salomons, scientist and inventor
 Jeffrey Goldstone
 Ian Grant
 Sir Peter Hirsch, physicist
 Herbert Huppert, 1987
 Brian David Josephson, physicist, 1973 Nobel Prize 
 George Kalmus, 1988
 Andrew Keller
 Olga Kennard, crystallographer 1987
 Rudolf Kompfner, invented the traveling wave tube
 Hans Kronberger, nuclear physicist
 Nicholas Kurti, physicist, Vice-President of the Royal Society 1965-67
 Frederick Lindemann, 1st Viscount Cherwell, physicist and politician
 Henry Lipson
 Sir Ben Lockspeiser
 Stanley Mandelstam
 Kurt Mendelssohn
 Leon Mestel, astronomer
 F.R. Nunes Nabarro
 Rudolf Peierls
 Michael Pepper
 Sir Joseph Rotblat, physicist, 1995 Nobel Peace Prize 
 Adolf Schallamach, physics of friction and wear of rubber
 Sir Arthur Schuster
 Dennis Sciama, FRS, cosmologist
 David Shoenberg, physics of low temperatures (JYB 1995 p193)
 Sir Francis Simon
 David Tabor
 Samuel Tolansky, spectroscopist
 Felix Weinberg
 Michael Woolfson, crystallographer, computer simulation 1984
 Alec David Young, aero-engineer
 John Ziman

Chemists

 Herbert Brown, chemist, 1979 Nobel Prize
 Sir Arnold Burgen
 Sir Roy Calne
 Jack David Dunitz, chemist
 Martin Fleischmann, chemist
 Rosalind Franklin, physical chemist and crystallographer, helped discover the structure of DNA
 Eugen Glueckauf
 Sir Ian Heilbron
 Walter Heitler
 Sir Aaron Klug, physicist and chemist, 1982 Nobel Prize
 Harold Kroto, discoverer of buckminsterfullerene, 1996 Nobel Prize (Jewish father; raised Jewish)
 Raphael Meldola
 Alfred Mond, chemist
 Ludwig Mond, chemist and industrialist
 Sir Robert Mond, chemist and archaeologist
 Albert Neuberger, chemical pathologist; father of Prof. James Neuberger, Lord Justice Sir David Neuberger and Prof. Michael Neuberger, and father-in-law of Julia Neuberger
 Friedrich Paneth
 Max Perutz, molecular biologist, 1962 Nobel Prize 
 Michael Polanyi, chemist; naturalised British 1939
 Ralph Raphael
 Michael Rossmann
Jeremy Sanders
 Anthony Segal
 Franz Sondheimer, organic chemist
 Michael Szwarc, polymer chemistry
 Carl Warburg, doctor of medicine and clinical pharmacologist
 Chaim Weizmann, acetone production; first president of Israel

Biologists

 Saul Adler
 Ephraim Anderson, microbiologist
 Charlotte Auerbach
 Dame Val Beral, breast cancer researcher
 Walter Bodmer, geneticist
 Gustav Victor Rudolf Born, professor of pharmacology
 Sydney Brenner, molecular biologist, 2002Nobel Prize
 Leslie Brent
 Edith Bülbring, pharmacologist (Jewish mother)
 Sir Ernst Chain, co-developer of penicillin, 1945 Nobel Prize
 Sir Philip Cohen, biologist
 Sydney Cohen, pathologist
 Emanuel Mendes da Costa, 18th-century botanist
 Raymond Dwek, biologist
 Sir Michael Epstein, co-discoverer of the Epstein-Barr virus
 Wilhelm Feldberg, pharmacologist
 Sir Alan Fersht, protein folding
 Sir Otto Frankel, geneticist
 Ian Glynn
 Professor Sir Abraham Goldberg, Regius Professor of Medicine, University of Glasgow and world authority on porphyria
 Susan Greenfield, Baroness Greenfield, neuroscientist and writer (Jewish father)
 Hans Gruneberg, biologist
 Sir Ludwig Guttmann, neurologist
 Sir Henry Harris
 Philip D'Arcy Hart, medical researcher
 Sir Gabriel Horn
 Alick Isaacs, virologist, interferon
 David Ish-Horowicz
 Sir Bernard Katz, biophysicist, 1970 Nobel Prize
 David Keilin, enzymologist
 Sir Hans Kornberg
 Hans Kosterlitz, pharmacologist
 Sir Hans Adolf Krebs, biochemist, 1953 Nobel Prize 
 Sir John Krebs, zoologist
 Roland Levinsky, biologist
 Michael Levitt
 Hans Lissmann
 Joel Mandelstam
 Sir Michael Marmot, epidemiologist
 César Milstein, immunologist, 1984 Nobel Prize
 Leslie Orgel, evolutionary biologist
 Guido Pontecorvo
 Juda Quastel
 Ivan Roitt, immunologist 1983
 Steven Rose, biologist
 Sir Martin Roth, psychiatrist (JYB 2005 p214)
 Dame Miriam Louisa Rothschild, entomologist
 Victor Rothschild, 3rd Baron Rothschild
 Oliver Sacks, neurologist and author
 Isaac de Sequeira Samuda, first Jewish FRS, elected 1727
 Hannah Steinberg, psychopharmacologist
 John Vane, pharmacologist, 1982 Nobel Prize (Jewish father)
 Lawrence Weiskrantz, psychologist
 Robert Winston, Baron Winston, fertility expert and broadcaster
 Lewis Wolpert, developmental biologist and broadcaster
 John Yudkin, physiologist and nutritionist
 Lord Solly Zuckerman, anatomist, evolutionist

Mathematicians and statisticians
 Abraham Manie Adelstein, statistician
 Hertha Ayrton, mathematician and engineer
 Laurence Baxter, statistician
 Abram Besicovitch, Russian-born British mathematician (karaite)
 Selig Brodetsky, mathematician, President of the Board of Deputies of British Jews, and President of the Hebrew University of Jerusalem
 Jacob Bronowski, mathematician and broadcaster
 Paul Cohn, algebraist
 H.E. Daniels, statistician
 Philip Dawid, statistician
 Arthur Erdelyi, mathematician
 John Fox, statistician
 Albrecht Frohlich
 David Glass, demographer
 Sir Samuel Goldman, British government statistician
 Sydney Goldstein, expert on fluid mechanics
 Benjamin Gompertz, mathematician
 Eugene Grebenik, demographer
 Steven Haberman, professor of actuarial science
 John Hajnal, demographer
 Hans Heilbronn
 Thomas Körner, mathematician
 Ruth Lawrence, mathematician and child prodigy
 Leone Levi, statistician
 Kurt Mahler, mathematician
 Sir Claus Moser, statistician
 Louis Mordell, number theorist
 Bernhard Neumann
 Richard Rado, mathematician
 Klaus Roth, mathematician, 1958 Fields Medal 
 Bernard Silverman, statistician
 David Spiegelhalter, statistician
 James Joseph Sylvester, mathematician

Computer scientists

 Samson Abramsky, computer scientist
 David Deutsch, quantum computing pioneer
 I.J. Good, cryptographer, philosopher of statistics; computing pioneer
 David Levy, computer chess expert
 Leo Marks, cryptographer and screenwriter
 Max Newman, mathematician and computing pioneer (Jewish father)
 Gordon Plotkin, computer scientist
 Leslie Valiant, computer scientist; parallel computation

Economists
 Lord Bauer, economist
 Samuel Brittan, economist
 Charles Goodhart, Bank of England economist
 Noreena Hertz, economist and activist
 Richard Kahn, Baron Kahn, economist: multiplier
 Nicholas Kaldor, economist
 Michael Kidron, South African born Marxist economist, writer, cartographer and publisher
 Israel Kirzner, economist (UK-born)
 Ludwig Lachmann, economist
 Harold Laski, economist
 Alexander Nove, economist
 Sigbert Prais, economist
 David Ricardo, economist (converted to Quakerism)
 Arthur Seldon, economist
 Sir Hans Singer, economist
 Piero Sraffa, economist
 Lord Nicholas Stern, economist
 Basil Yamey, economist

Social scientists

 Roy Clive Abraham, linguist
 Mark Abrams, sociologist
 Michael Balint, psychoanalyst (converted to Unitarianism)
 Zygmunt Bauman, sociologist
 Basil Bernstein, linguist
 Vernon Bogdanor, professor of politics
 Georgina Born, anthropologist; daughter of Gustav Victor Rudolf Born
 Gerald Cohen, professor of social and political theory
 Arthur Lumley Davids, linguist and orientalist
 Norbert Elias, sociologist
 Herman Finer, political scientist
 Samuel Finer, political scientist
 Sir Moses I. Finley, historian and sociologist
 Meyer Fortes, anthropologist
 Eduard Fraenkel, philologist
 Anna Freud, child psychoanalyst
 Norman Geras, professor of Government
 Morris Ginsberg
 Max Gluckman, anthropologist
 Theodor Goldstücker, orientalist
 Jean Gottmann, professor of geography, Oxford University
 Julius Gould, sociologist (JYB 2005 p249)
 Paul Hirst, social theorist (Jewish mother)
 Marie Jahoda, psychology of discrimination
 Melanie Klein, child psychoanalyst
 Paul Klemperer, economist
 Geoffrey Lewis Lewis, professor of Turkish
 Steven Lukes, political scientist
 Ashley Montagu, anthropologist and humanist
 Nikolas Rose, Martin White Professor of Sociology, LSE
 Isaac Schapera, anthropologist
 Edward Ullendorff, linguist

See also
Lists of Jews
List of British Jews

References
 JYB = Jewish Year Book

Footnotes

External links
 Jinfo

Scientists
Lists of European scientists
Scientists, Jewish
List
Scientists, Jewish